Mao Junfa (born August 1965) is a Chinese engineer and academic. He is a professor of engineering at Shanghai Jiao Tong University (SJTU).

Mao received his BS from the National University of Defense Technology in 1985, and went on to the Chinese Academy of Science's Shanghai Institute of Nuclear Research for his MS (1988) and SJTU for his PhD (1992). He undertook postdoctoral work at the Chinese University of Hong Kong and the University of California, Berkeley before returning to SJTU to join the faculty. He was named Fellow of the Institute of Electrical and Electronics Engineers (IEEE) in 2012 "for contributions to interconnects and passive components in integrated circuits and systems".

References 

1965 births
Living people
Fellow Members of the IEEE
Members of the Chinese Academy of Sciences
National University of Defense Technology alumni
Academic staff of Shanghai Jiao Tong University